Sir Robert Dalzell, 1st Baronet (1639−1686), was a Scottish politician. He was the son of the Honourable Sir John Dalzell and Agnes Nisbet. His paternal grandfather was Robert Dalzell, 1st Lord Dalzell.

He married, firstly, Catherine Sandilands, daughter of Sir James Sandilands and Lady Agnes Carnegie. They had one daughter together. He married, secondly, Lady Margaret Johnstone, daughter of James Johnstone, 1st Earl of Hartfell and Margaret Douglas, on 11 October 1654. He married, thirdly, Violet Riddell, with whom he had three sons.
 
Sir Robert held the office of Member of Parliament for the sheriffdom of Dumfries between 1665 and 1674, and again from 1681 to 1682. He finally held the office in 1685.

He was created a Baronet of Glenae, Dumfries on 11 April 1666, in the Baronetage of Nova Scotia.

He died in April 1686, and was succeeded in his baronetcy by his eldest son, John Dalzell. His grandson, Robert Dalzell, was eventually to succeed as Earl of Carnwath.

See also
Earl of Carnwath

References

Baronets in the Baronetage of Nova Scotia
Members of the Convention of the Estates of Scotland 1665
Members of the Convention of the Estates of Scotland 1667
Members of the Parliament of Scotland 1669–1674
Members of the Parliament of Scotland 1681–1682
Members of the Parliament of Scotland 1685–1686